"Quintuplets 2000" (also known as "Contorting Quintuplets 2000" in some syndicated markets and "Quintuplets" on the South Park Studios website) is the fourth episode of the fourth season of the American animated television series South Park, and the 52nd episode of the series overall. In production order, this is the 3rd episode of Season 4. It was originally broadcast on April 26, 2000. The episode is based on the Dionne quintuplets and the then-recent Elián González affair, the case of a Cuban-born child who had been taken by federal authorities four days before the episode aired.

Plot

After watching Cirque Du Cheville (a "Cirque du Soleil" parody) and liking the performance of quintuplets from the show in particular, the boys hope to make a new performance artist style circus. The boys, however, think Kenny needs to learn how to sing first. Meanwhile, the Romanian contorting quintuplets from the show,  along with their grandmother, try to escape from the Romanian government hoping to bring them back. The five end up at the Marsh house, asking for shelter. Meanwhile, Kenny learns to sing opera through a fictional For Dummies installment, which features "Con te partirò" by Andrea Bocelli. At the Marsh house, Grandpa Marsh and the quints' grandmother (using her own contortion skills) have sex.

The next morning, a shocked Randy finds the grandmother dead (after a night with Grandpa Marsh). After telling the quints, and with some persuasion from Cartman, Stan, and Kyle (who hope to use the quints for their circus, in which their performance is to do some contortions wearing only underpants with the Quints doing their performance), Stan's parents let the quints stay with them. The boys then decide to show the quints how great America is, taking them to, among other things, a sheep-shearing contest and a shopping mall, hoping they'll stay and do their circus. Meanwhile, the Romanian government seek Janet Reno to help get the quints back. Also, seeking to get to Romania for opera lessons, Kenny sings the aria "La donna è mobile" from Verdi's Rigoletto for money in order to acquire transport for him and his mother. In Romania, Kenny proves to be a successful opera singer while after his mother realizes that the small amount of money that she brought from the US provides them with two months of food and housing due to the massive cost of living difference between Romania and the United States, the two decide to stay. Back in the US, the Marsh house is surrounded by protesters, hoping to let the quints stay. Reno dresses as the Easter Bunny and armed with a gun and an Easter Egg-shaped tear gas canister, captures the quints. Stan, Kyle and Cartman, who don't want to lose their circus, enlist the help of the protesters outside to get the quints back.

A large amount of violence starts between the protesters and government soldiers, which is stopped by the quints after they tell off all the groups on their shortcomings: their father for acting like he missed them when he in fact walked out on them five years ago, the Romanian Leaders for caring nothing about them and only wanted to make America look stupid, the protesters for having nothing better to do, and the boys (whom they consider the worst of all) for their ignorance about Romanian culture, arrogant assumptions about America's superiority, and only wanting to use the girls to perform in their circus. They then get in Oprah Winfrey's limousine for an upcoming press tour and tell everyone to "Kiss our little white Romanian asses".

Meanwhile, the exact opposite of the quints' situation is occurring with Kenny in Romania. With Romanians protesting outside his house to let him stay, American soldiers invade the house and Kenny is inadvertently killed by the U.S. government, who had hoped to bring him back alive.

Production
As explained in the FAQ section on the official website, "When the year 2000 was coming up, everyone and their brother had '2000' in the titles of their products and TV shows.  America was obsessed with 2000, so Trey Parker put '2000' in the titles to make fun of the ubiquity of the phrase." Originally, the plot involved returning the quintuplets and Kenny to their respective countries, but shortly after Elian Gonzalez was taken from his Miami relatives' home the Saturday before Easter 2000, April 22, Parker and Stone quickly changed the plot so that it would look exactly like the Miami raid.

References

External links

 "Quintuplets 2000" Full episode at South Park Studios
 

Fictional contortionists
Fictional Romanian people
South Park (season 4) episodes
Television episodes set in circuses
Easter television episodes